Heike Lehmann (later Grund now Weber, born 29 March 1962) is a female German former volleyball player who competed for East Germany in the 1980 Summer Olympics.

She was born in Neustrelitz. In 1980 she was part of the East German team which won the silver medal in the Olympic tournament. She played all five matches.

References 

1962 births
Living people
German women's volleyball players
Olympic volleyball players of East Germany
Volleyball players at the 1980 Summer Olympics
Olympic silver medalists for East Germany
Olympic medalists in volleyball
Medalists at the 1980 Summer Olympics
People from Neustrelitz
Sportspeople from Mecklenburg-Western Pomerania
20th-century German women
21st-century German women